and [2011] UKSC 36 is a UK labour law case, concerning the test for when the continued used of a fixed term contract is objectively justified, and when employees are covered by employment rights during work abroad. The case was joined with Secretary of State for Children, Schools and Families v Fletcher.

During consideration of the case, Lord Rodger died. He participated in judgment on the point about fixed term contracts, but not in the judgment on unfair dismissal.

Facts
Duncombe and other teachers were employed by the government to teach in various schools in the EU under the Statute of the European Schools. They taught children of officials and employees of the EU. They were claiming unfair dismissal because there was no objective justification for using fixed term contracts, and they contended they should be regarded as permanent under the Fixed-term Employees (Prevention of Less Favourable Treatment) Regulations 2002 regulation 8. Alternatively, they claimed that they had been unfairly dismissed under the Employment Rights Act 1996 section 94.

Fletcher, had worked at the European School, Culham, Oxfordshire, while Duncombe had worked at the European School, Karlsruhe, Germany. The contracts were limited to nine years, or exceptionally ten years under the Regulations for Members of the Seconded Staff of the European Schools 1996. The Secretary of State claimed it was not for the court of one member state to question the Regulations, or that the nine-year rule was objectively justified. The Secretary of State also contended that Duncombe was not covered because he was outside the UK.

The Court of Appeal held successive fixed-term contracts for work in European schools was not objectively justified.

Judgment
Lady Hale and Lord Rodger decided that use of successive fixed term contracts was objectively justified under the Regulations.

Lord Mance, Lord Collins and Lord Clarke agreed. The cross appeal concerned whether UK labour law applied so that there could be an unfair dismissal complaint under ERA 1996 section 94, on which judgment was reserved.  Lord Rodger died in the meantime.

On the cross appeal question, Lady Hale held that the teachers were protected by Employment Rights Act 1996 section 94.

See also

UK labour law

Notes

References

United Kingdom labour case law
2011 in case law
2011 in British law
Supreme Court of the United Kingdom cases